The 1957 Temple Owls football team was an American football team that represented Temple University as an independent during the 1957 NCAA College Division football season. In its second season under head coach Peter P. Stevens, the team compiled a 1–6 record. The team played its home games at Temple Stadium in Philadelphia.

Temple did not play its scheduled date with the University of Scranton on Oct. 26, as an outbreak of Asian flu affecting more than a dozen of the Royals' players prompted Scranton to cancel the game.

The Owls began a 21-game losing streak (the longest in school history) on November 2, 1957; they did not win another game until September 24, 1960. Stevens was assisted by Gavin White and John Rogers. 

Lou Grandizio and Bill Medve were Freshman assistant coaches under Head Coach Roger White.

Schedule

References

Temple
Temple Owls football seasons
Temple Owls football